Poddol is a rural locality (a village) in Lavrovskoye Rural Settlement, Sudogodsky District, Vladimir Oblast, Russia. The population was 6 as of 2010.

Geography 
Poddol is located 17 km north of Sudogda (the district's administrative centre) by road. Mikhalevo is the nearest rural locality.

References 

Rural localities in Sudogodsky District
Sudogodsky Uyezd